"Imagination" is a popular song with music written by Jimmy Van Heusen and the lyrics by Johnny Burke. The song was first published in 1940. The two best-selling versions were recorded by the orchestras of Glenn Miller and Tommy Dorsey in 1940.

Composition

Jimmy Van Heusen originally wrote the song when he was a teenager, but with different words.  When he later played the tune for Johnny Burke (without the lyrics), Burke wrote the "Imagination" lyrics.

Recordings
The recording by Glenn Miller (vocals Ray Eberle) was released by Bluebird Records as catalog number 10622. It first reached the Billboard magazine Best Seller chart on July 20, 1940 and lasted 3 weeks on the chart, peaking at #3.

The recording by Tommy Dorsey was released by Victor Records as catalog number 26581. It reached the Billboard magazine Best Seller chart at #8 on July 20, 1940, its only week on the chart.

Miki Howard rendition

The song was covered in 1987 by American R&B singer Miki Howard. Released as the second single from Howard's debut album, Come Share My Love. The song was a top 20 R&B hit, peaking at number 13 on the Hot R&B Singles chart.

Charts

Other recorded versions
The song has been recorded by, among others:
Steve Allen (released by Columbia Records as catalog number 39589)
Georgie Auld and his orchestra (recorded February 1940, released by Varsity Records as catalog number 8199)
Chet Baker - Chet Baker Quartet featuring Russ Freeman (Pacific Jazz)
Shirley Bassey
Dave Brubeck - Plays and Plays and Plays (1962)
Chick Bullock and his orchestra (recorded February 21, 1940, released by Vocalion Records as catalog number 5434)

June Christy - Fair and Warmer! (1957); A Friendly Session, Vol. 1 (2000) with the Johnny Guarnieri Quintet 
Petula Clark (recorded 1963, released by Pye Records as catalog number 7N15517)
Rosemary Clooney - Love (1963), and Rosemary Clooney Sings the Music of Jimmy Van Heusen (Concord, 1986)
Harry Connick, Jr. on 20
Bing Crosby and John Scott Trotter's orchestra (recorded December 24, 1947, released by Decca Records as catalog number 24696)
Doris Day (recorded November, 1947, released by Columbia Records as catalog number 38423, also as catalog number 38698)
Al Donahue and his orchestra (recorded March 18, 1940, released by Vocalion Records as catalog number 5434, also by Conqueror Records as catalog number 9453)
Jimmy Dorsey
Bob Dylan - Triplicate (2017)
Billy Eckstine  with Pete Rugolo arr, cond) and his All Stars, including Pete Candoli (tp), Don Fagerquist (tp), Bud Shank (as, fl), Gerald Wiggins (p), Red Callender (b), Larry Bunker (ds).  Recorded in Los Angeles, CA on January 2, 1958.
Percy Faith & His Orchestra with Mitch Miller from the album "It's So Peaceful In The Country"
Ella Fitzgerald (recorded February 15, 1940, released by Decca Records as catalog number 3078B) and recorded live in 1961 at the Crescendo Club in West Hollywood (released in 2009 in the album Twelve Nights In Hollywood).
Maynard Ferguson - Boy With Lots of Brass (1957) (vocal by Irene Kral)
The Fleetwoods
The Four Freshmen - Golden Anniversary Celebrations (2001)
Curtis Fuller - Imagination (Savoy 1960)
Johnny Griffin - Tough Tenors (Jazzland 1960)
Lionel Hampton
Dick Haymes - The Complete Capitol Collection (2006)
Miki Howard - Come Share My Love (1986)
Keith Jarrett - on disc 4 of Keith Jarrett at the Blue Note (1994)
Jazz Lab -  Jazz Lab (1957)
Stan Kenton - on the album The Romantic Approach (1961)
Cleo Laine (released 1968 on her album That Old Feeling)
Dean Martin (released October 1960 on his album This Time I'm Swingin'!)
Art Pepper on his 1957 album Art Pepper Meets the Rhythm SectionLucy Ann Polk - Lucy Ann Polk with the Dave Pell Octet (1954)
The Quotations recorded a doo-wop version in 1961 on Verve Records (VK10245)
Andy Russell (released by Capitol Records as catalog number 20034)
Jan Savitt and his orchestra (recorded January 24, 1940, released by Decca Records as catalog number 2990B)
Little Jimmy Scott (released by Savoy Records as catalog number 1174)
Rocky Sharpe & the Replays had a UK Top 40 hit with a Doo-wop version in 1979.
Dinah Shore (recorded February 21, 1940, released by Bluebird Records as catalog number 10668)
Frank Sinatra and Tommy Dorsey - Legendary Sides (1997)
Kate Smith (recorded May 1, 1940, released by Columbia Records as catalog number 35486)
Keely Smith - I Wish You Love (1957)
Jeri Southern - Bygone Days (2009), Romance in the Dark  (2009)
Jess Stacy (released by Capitol Records as catalog number 1136)
Jo Stafford on her album Jo + Jazz (1960)
Sonny Stitt Kaleidoscope (Prestige 1952)
Ted Straeter and his orchestra (recorded February 21, 1940, released by Columbia Records as catalog number 35402)
Fred Waring and his orchestra (recorded June 28, 1944, released by Decca Records as catalog number 29219)
Fran Warren on her album Hey There! Here's Fran Warren released in 1957 By Pickwick
Joe Williams
Florence Wright (recorded February 11, 1950, released by National Records as catalog number 9105)
Joe Lovano on his 1996 album Celebrating Sinatra''
Victor Young and orchestra (released by Decca Records as catalog number 28570)
Michigan Jake 2001 barbershop quartet champions. Released on their album "For the Record". Song arranged by Lou Perry. (2000)
Trio Désolé featuring Lorraine Caron (recorded in 2013 and released on their album "Sweet Surrender") arrangement and Piano by Floyd Pientka, Anders Dahlberg on Bass.

References

External links
 Jimmy Van Heusen Website

1940 songs
Songs with lyrics by Johnny Burke (lyricist)
Songs with music by Jimmy Van Heusen
Glenn Miller songs
Tommy Dorsey songs
Shirley Bassey songs
Petula Clark songs
Rosemary Clooney songs
Harry Connick Jr. songs
Bing Crosby songs
Doris Day songs
Jimmy Dorsey songs
Ella Fitzgerald songs
The Fleetwoods songs
Miki Howard songs
Dean Martin songs
Dinah Shore songs
Frank Sinatra songs
Jo Stafford songs
1987 singles
Song recordings produced by LeMel Humes
Bluebird Records singles
Atlantic Records singles